Battle of Oslo may refer to:

 Battle of Oslo (1161)
 Battle of Oslo (1218)
 Battle of Oslo (1239)
 Battle of Oslo (1308)

See also
 Battle of Oslo (football) – the football derby between FC Lyn Oslo and Vålerenga Fotball